The  is a compact executive car sold by Lexus, a luxury division of Toyota since 1999. The IS was originally sold under the  nameplate in Japan from 1998 (the word Altezza is Italian for 'height' or 'highness'). The IS was introduced as an entry-level sport model positioned below the ES in the Lexus lineup.

The first-generation Altezza (codename XE10) was launched in Japan in October 1998, while the Lexus IS 200 (GXE10) made its debut in Europe in 1999 and in North America as the IS 300 (JCE10) in 2000. The first-generation models were powered by a straight-six engine and available in sedan and wagon variants. The second-generation IS (codename XE20) was launched globally in 2005 with V6-powered IS 250 (GSE20) and IS 350 (GSE21) sedan models, followed by a high-performance V8 sedan version, the IS F, in 2007, and coupé convertible versions, the IS 250 C and IS 350 C, in 2008. The third-generation Lexus IS premiered in January 2013 and includes the V6-powered IS 350 and IS 250, turbocharged IS 200t/300, hybrid IS 300h and performance-tuned F Sport variants. The IS designation stands for "Intelligent Sport".

First generation (XE10; 1998) 

Produced as a direct competitor to the luxury sports sedans of the leading European luxury marques, the XE10 series Toyota Altezza and Lexus IS was designed with a greater performance emphasis than typically seen on prior Japanese luxury vehicles. The engineering work was led by Nobuaki Katayama from 1994 to 1998 under the 038T program code, who was responsible for the AE86 project. Design work by Tomoyasu Nishi was frozen in 1996 and filed under patent number 1030135 on 5 December 1996, at the Japan Patent Office. At its introduction to Japan, it was exclusive to Japanese dealerships called Toyota Netz Store, until Lexus was introduced to Japan in 2006. The Japan-sold AS200 Altezza sedan and AS300 Altezza Gita correspond to the Lexus IS 200 and IS 300 models respectively, as sold in markets outside of Japan. The Lexus IS' primary markets were North America, Australia, and Europe. The Altezza Gita was a hatchback-station wagon version sold in Japan and was known in the US and Europe as the Lexus IS SportCross. The AS300 Altezza Gita was the only Altezza with the 2JZ-GE engine; in export markets this engine was available in the sedan models as well as the Lexus IS300 Sedan.

1998–2000 
Introduced in 1998 with the AS200 (Chassis code GXE10) and RS200 (chassis code SXE10) sedans, the compact vehicle was produced using a shortened, front-engine, rear-wheel-drive midsize platform, allowing Japanese buyers to take advantage of tax savings imposed by Japanese government regulations concerning vehicle engine displacement (but not exterior dimensions, as the car was 20 mm wider than the 1,700 mm standard), and adapted parts from the larger second-generation Aristo/GS. The 2.0-litre 1G-FE straight-six powered AS200 (GXE10, sedan) was equipped with a six-speed manual transmission as standard, while a four-speed automatic was optional. The 2.0-litre 3S-GE straight-four-powered RS200 (SXE10, sedan) was equipped a six-speed manual transmission, while a five-speed automatic was optional. The different size engine choices gave Japanese buyers a choice of which annual road tax obligation they wanted to pay, and the larger engine offered more standard equipment as compensation.

The design received critical acclaim at its 1998 launch and was awarded Japan's "Car of the Year" honor for 1998–1999. A few months later, Lexus began marketing the IS 200 equivalent models in Europe. The styling cues of the rear lamp clusters on the first-generation models were copied by a number of after-market accessory manufacturers for applications on other vehicles. This iconic style of one or more internal lamp units, covered with a clear (or tinted) perspex cover made popular by Lexus, became known in many circles as 'Lexus-style' or 'Altezza lights'. The taillight style became so popular, that it influenced the development of clear-covered LED taillamps that only revealed their colour when illuminated. The XE10's chief engineer was Nobuaki Katayama, while the chief test driver and test engineer was Hiromu Naruse.

2000–2003 
In July 2000, a hatchback/station wagon model, the AS300 (Chassis code JCE10), was introduced featuring a 3.0-litre 2JZ-GE straight-six engine. Equipped with rear- or all-wheel drive (JCE10, RWD Gita wagon; JCE15, 4WD Gita wagon), the AS300 was only available with an automatic gearbox; a five-speed automatic for the RWD Gita wagon and a four-speed automatic for the 4WD Gita wagon. The six-cylinder version (2JZ-GE) was only available in Japan on the Gita models. In the US, the IS 300 sedan debuted in July 2000 as 2001 model and the wagon debuted in 2001 as a 2002 model with the same 3.0-litre six-cylinder engine (the 2.0-litre six-cylinder was not available), while in Europe, the IS 300 joined the IS 200 in the model lineup. All IS 300 models in the US were initially only available with the five-speed automatic transmission; this was also the case in Europe. However, a five-speed manual was made available in the US in 2001 for the 2002 model year (not available on the SportCross wagon). Visually the exterior of the European IS 200 Sport and 300 were almost identical, the only differences being the boot insignia and the larger-engined model initially having clear front indicators (later generalized to IS 200 range).

The first-generation IS' interior featured unique elements not typically found in other Lexus models. These included a chrome metal ball shifter (USDM & European market, other markets received an optional leather-trimmed shifter), (optional) pop-up navigation screen, and chronograph-style instrument panel (with mini gauges for temperature, fuel economy, and volts). For the European and Australian markets, the IS 300 gained full leather seats rather than the leather/ecsaine of the 200, plus Auto-dimming rear view and side mirrors, and HID headlamps. In the US, the Environmental Protection Agency listed the IS 300 as a subcompact car; although it technically had enough overall volume to be called a compact, rear seat room exhibited subcompact dimensions.

The US National Highway Traffic Safety Administration (NHTSA) crash test results in 2001 gave the IS 300 the maximum five stars in the Side Driver and Side Rear Passenger categories, and four stars in the Frontal Driver and Frontal Passenger categories. The Insurance Institute for Highway Safety (IIHS) rated the IS "Good" overall for frontal collisions and "Good" in all six measured front impact categories.

For the first-generation IS in the North American market, sales hit a high of 22,486 units in 2001; subsequent sales years were less than forecast, and below the 10,000-unit mark in 2004. The IS 200 fared better relative to sales targets in Europe and Asia, while still well short of the sales volume achieved by the Mercedes-Benz C-Class and other, mostly German-made competitors. This trend was indicative of Lexus' smaller global status; while Lexus' range of cars was very successful in North America, the marque's sales lagged behind its German rivals in Europe. In Europe, the lack of a manual gearbox option for the IS 300 may have limited sales in contrast to its rivals, the BMW 3 Series and the Mercedes C-Class.

In 2000, TTE introduced a compressor kit for the IS 200 in the European market. An Eaton supercharger at 0.3-bar pressure increased the power output to  without sacrificing fuel consumption (+3.3%). The kit was initially available as an aftermarket fitment, but could also be obtained as OEM Lexus accessory on newer cars through the official Lexus dealer network and was fully covered by the standard warranty. This variant was discontinued when the IS 300 was introduced in the European market.

2003–2005 

In 2003 for the 2004 model year, the IS line received a minor facelift (designed by Hiroyuki Tada). On the exterior, was a redesigned 11-spoke wheel design, redesigned fog lamps, and smoked surrounding trim for the headlamps and taillamps. On the interior, a 2-position memory function was added for the driver seat, a maintenance indicator lamp, automatic drive-away door locking system, a storage compartment on the dash (for models without the navigation system) and updated trim highlights.

An official concept model, the MillenWorks-built Lexus IS 430 was unveiled at the SEMA Show in Las Vegas, Nevada, in 2003. The IS 430 prototype was an IS 300 fitted with a 4.3-litre V8 from the GS 430. Lexus dubbed the IS 430 a one-off with no plans for production. In Europe, Toyota Team Europe (TTE) installed a supercharged 4.3-litre V8 into an IS 300 bodyshell, the result was a  ECE sedan.

Powertrain and models

Second generation (XE20; 2005)

2005–2008 
The second-generation of the IS was introduced at the Geneva Motor Show in March 2005 as a pre-production model, with the production version debuting at the 2005 New York International Auto Show that April. Sales of the sedan began worldwide in September and October 2005 as a 2006 model, with the Toyota Altezza name discontinued due to the introduction of the Lexus marque in Japan, and the slow-selling SportCross station wagon version discontinued from the lineup altogether.

The second-generation IS marked the next introduction of Lexus' L-finesse design philosophy on a production vehicle, following the premiere of the 2006 GS executive sedan. The sedan's exterior design featured sleeker, coupé-like contours, a fastback profile, and a repeated arrowhead motif in the front fascia and side windows.

Production of the sedan commenced in September 2005 at the Miyata plant in Miyawaka, Fukuoka, supplemented in October 2005 with the Tahara plant at Tahara, Aichi. Production of the IS F started in December 2007 at Tahara. The facility at Miyata began manufacture of the IS C in April 2009.

In North America, IS models sold at launch included the IS 250 and IS 350 sedans; in parts of Europe, the IS models sold by Lexus included the IS 250 and IS 220d sedans. The IS 250 was also available in Australia, New Zealand, Thailand, Singapore, Hong Kong, Taiwan, Chile (automatic only), South Africa and South Korea.

All second-generation IS models offered a more typical Lexus interior compared to the previous generation with a focus on luxurious amenities. The interior is equipped memory leather seats, lightsaber-like electroluminescent instrument display lighting and LED interior lighting accents, the choice of faux-metallic or optional Bird's Eye Maple wood trim (aluminium composite on the IS F), and SmartAccess keyless entry with push-button start. Options ranged from touchscreen navigation with backup camera to a Mark Levinson premium sound system and Dynamic Radar Cruise Control.

On 6 December 2006, Lexus officially confirmed the existence of a high-performance variant of the second-generation IS called the IS F. The Lexus IS F sedan (USE20) premiered at the 2007 North American International Auto Show on 8 January 2007 as the launch product of Lexus' F marque lineup of performance-focused vehicles. The IS F went on sale several months later in North America and Europe.

The introduction of the second-generation IS model marked a resurgence in sales for the IS line, with a 332% increase overall in 2006 compared to the previous year. In its first year of sales, the IS sold over 49,000 units, making it one of the ten best-selling luxury cars in the US. The IS line later took a median position in the entry-luxury market; in 2008 it sold behind the variants of the BMW 3 Series, Mercedes-Benz C-Class, and Cadillac CTS, and ahead of the Acura TL, Audi A4, and Infiniti G sedan. Outside the US, the Lexus IS spearheaded Lexus' growing sales efforts in Europe, Australia, and South Africa, becoming the best-selling model in Lexus' lineup in many of the aforementioned markets. In the US, as of 2011, the Lexus IS was the third place best-selling vehicle from the marque after the Lexus RX and Lexus ES.

2008–2010 

In 2008, the IS line received a facelift, and the suspension and steering were retuned for improved stability and control. After three years with only one body style, the IS returned with a second body style, this time as a coupé convertible, on 2 October 2008 when the IS 250 C debuted at the Paris Motor Show. A more powerful IS 350 C also became available, with engine specifications analogous to those on the sedan models. The IS convertible went on sale in Europe in 2009, in North America in May 2009, and an IS 300 C was also produced for certain regions. The mid-cycle refresh in 2008 saw slight styling revisions to the interior.

2010–2013 

Building on its "F Sport" line of parts and accessories for the IS 250/350, Lexus added factory-produced F Sport IS models in 2010. This facelift also includes further interior updates for the IS line.

2013–2015 
Changes to the IS C include Intelligent Transport Systems and Dedicated Short Range Communication units become standard equipment. Change to US model of F SPORT Package includes revised silver metallic interior trim. Change to Japan F SPORT Package includes dark rose interior colour, medium silver ornament panel. F SPORT performance accessories include 19-inch forged wheels (set of four), with hardware; brake upgrades, front axle set, rear axle set, carbon fibre engine cover, carbon fibre leather shift knob, floor mats (four-piece set), lowering spring set, performance air intake, performance dual exhaust, shock set (set of four), sway bar set Japan models went on sale on 22 August 2013. Early models include IS 250C, IS 350C. US models went on sale as 2014 model year vehicle. Early models include IS 250C, IS 350C.

Changes to IS F include a carbon fibre rear spoiler, front LED fog lamp, all sports seats include embossed 'F' logo at head rests, Alcantara upholstery door trim and center console, standard Intelligent Transport Systems, and Dedicated Short Range Communication unit. IS F Dynamic Sport Tuning model (available in Japan) includes  engine power increase via low-friction piston and pump, strengthened body contact, carbon fibre front spoiler/rear diffuser,  lower body weight via titanium muffler, orange colour brake caliper with LEXUS logo, orange accent engine headcover, carbon interior panel on the centre console and door switch base with nameplate, choice of 7 body colours including starlight black glass flake. Japan models went on sale on 5 September 2013. US models went on sale as 2014 model year vehicle.

Safety 
Safety equipment on the IS models ranged from multiple airbags to stability control systems. A Pre-Collision System (PCS) was the first offered in the entry-luxury performance sedan market segment. NHTSA crash test results rated the second-generation IS the maximum five stars in the Side Driver and Rollover categories, and four stars in the Frontal Driver, Frontal Passenger, and Side Rear Passenger categories; Insurance Institute for Highway Safety scores were "Good" overall score for all fourteen measured categories in the front and side impact crash tests.

Powertrains 

The IS 250, IS 350 and IS F is equipped with a D-4 (IS250) or D-4S (IS350 and IS F) direct injection system with direct fuel injectors (D-4 and D-4S) and port fuel injectors (D-4S only). Certain Asian markets have the IS 300 (GSE22) model without direct injection.

Third generation (XE30; 2013)

Concept model 

The LF-CC concept unveiled at the 2012 Paris Motor Show and later Auto Shanghai 2013 is a rear-wheel drive coupé incorporating designs from LF-LC concept and Lexus LFA. Main features include a 2.5-litre four-cylinder Atkinson cycle petrol engine with D-4S direct injection technology, water-cooled permanent magnet electric motor, 3 LED-projector headlamp design, Daytime Running Lights (DRLs) are integrated into the upper bumper surface, rear spoiler integrated within the boot lid, L-shaped combination lamps with three-dimensional design, Fluid Titanium body colour, 2-zone dashboard, seats, door panels and instrument binnacle hood upholstered in amber leather.

2013–2016 

The production version of the IS was introduced at the North American International Auto Show in January 2013, followed by the 2013 Auto Shanghai. Exterior design work was done by Masanari Sakae during 2010–2011 and the F Sport models were styled by Yuki Isogai in 2011. For the car's third generation, Lexus also hinted at a revival for the IS SportCross station wagon, but that didn't end up happening.

The IS F Sport models include enhanced handling and performance, Adaptive Variable Suspension and Variable Gear Ratio Steering (IS 350). Not only does the F Sport
models handle differently, but they are more aggressively styled to set them apart from the base production models. F-Sport styling includes an edition specific F-Sport pattern front grille, F-Sport logo badges, and five spoke split graphite wheels; the cabin includes carbon fibre-like trim, extra bolstered performance seats, an all-black headliner, and a moving vessel gauge cluster (inspired by the Lexus LFA) that displays navigation and audio information. The F-Sport models have an edition specific Ultra White exterior and Rioja Red interior. The 2014 model year also served as the first year to offer all-wheel drive in the IS F Sport line up. and Octagon Club in South Korea

International models went on sale in mid-2013. Early models included the IS 250 RWD, IS 250 AWD, IS 300h and IS 350 RWD. The hybrid IS 300h model is sold in Europe, Japan, and select international markets.

US models went on sale as 2014 model year vehicles on 28 June 2013. Early models include IS 250 RWD, IS 250 AWD, IS 350 RWD, IS 350 AWD. In 2015, for the 2016 model year, the IS 250 was discontinued and replaced by the rear wheel drive only IS 200t. The IS 300 is only offered with all-wheel drive, while the top-of-the-line IS 350 can be ordered with either drivetrain. The IS AWD versions use a full-time all-wheel drive system that utilizes a planetary gearset center differential coupled with a multi-disc clutch to act as the slip limiting device. The planetary gearset provides a 30:70 front-to-rear torque split under normal conditions for handling agility, however the system can allow for a torque split of up to 50:50 to control wheel slip. In August 2017, for the 2018 model year, the IS 300 RWD changed to using the 2.0-litre four-cylinder engine from the previous IS 200t while the IS 300 AWD retained the same 3.5-litre V6 engine.

Chinese models went on sale in 2013. Early models include the IS 250 and the IS 250 F Sport.

Japanese models went on sale on 16 May 2013. Early models include the IS 250, IS 250 AWD, IS 350 and the IS 300h.

European models arrived at dealerships in 2013 June/July. Early models include the IS 250 and the IS 300h.

South Korean models went on sale on 27 June 2013. Early models include the IS 250 Supreme and the IS 250 Executive.

Australian models went on sale in July 2013. Only rear-wheel-drive versions were on offer, the models included the IS 250, IS 300h and the IS 350. The IS 250 was dropped from the line-up in September 2015 and was replaced with the IS 200t.

2016–2020 

The revamped third generation model includes updated headlamps, taillamps, front fascia and hood. It debuted at the April 2016 Beijing Auto Show with interior technology improvements including 10.3 inch infotainment screen, updated steering wheel, and contrast stitching along the dash.

The Lexus IS receives subtle updates in 2017, for the 2018 model year. Most notably, its V-6 engines get a 5-hp power increase, and the rear-drive, inline-four-powered IS200t is now called the IS300. Joining the options list is adaptive front lighting, which turns the headlights with the steering wheel to improve visibility. The F Sport performance trim now includes a standard limited-slip rear differential, but only in the top-tier rear-drive IS350.

2020–present 
The IS received a major makeover in 2020 for the 2021 model year. The updated styling includes a larger bodywork, restyled headlamps and full-width taillamps, slightly updated dashboard, and a larger spindle grille design. Android Auto and Apple CarPlay capabilities were made available, as well as upgraded driver-assistance systems and standard blind-spot monitoring. The suspension has also been revised with a more rigid body. In the United States, the F Sport trim is only available on the top IS350 model with its  3.5-liter V-6.

Dynamic Handling Package (DHP), which includes Adaptive Variable Suspension, lighter 19-inch black BBS alloy wheels, Sport S and Sport S+ drive select modes, and carbon fibre rear spoiler, is available for the IS 350 F Sport.

Following the introduction of stricter crash safety regulations, the IS, along with the CT hatchback and the RC coupe, were pulled out from the Australian market in November 2021.

IS 500 F Sport Performance 
In February 2021, for the 2022 model year, the first V8-powered model since the IS F, called the IS 500 F Sport Performance, was unveiled and went on sale exclusively in North America in the third quarter of 2021. The IS 500 F Sport Performance is offered rear-wheel drive only and features the same 5.0 L (4,969 cc) 2UR-GSE engine offered in the IS F, RC F, GS F, and LC 500, rated at 472 horsepower and 395 lb⋅ft of torque in this version. This is the first Lexus model classified as "F Sport Performance", signifying a new class of model that offers the power output and engine of higher "F" marque models, but without the wider body, interior appointments such as sport bucket seats, nor extensively upgraded and tuned brakes, suspension, and chassis.

Distinguishing it from other IS F Sport models, the IS 500 F Sport Performance includes a raised hood bulge for the larger V8 engine, stacked quad exhaust tips, Yamaha rear performance dampers, F Sport–tuned Adaptive Variable Suspension, two-piece aluminum 14.0-in front and 12.7-in rear brake rotors, dark chrome window trim, F Sport Performance front door-sill scuff plates, IS 500 startup animation in multi-information display, and F Sport Performance 19-in staggered-width split-10-spoke Enkei alloy wheels, with optional 19-in split-seven-spoke forged alloy Matte Black BBS wheels. For 2023, the IS 500 F Sport Performance Premium offers an exclusive Special Appearance Package with Molten Pearl exterior paint, Black NuLuxe interior, 19-inch Matte Black BBS forged alloy wheels, unique color-matched floor-trimmed mats and matching key gloves.

Equipment 
Toyota Racing Development (TRD) F Sport parts for Japanese IS sedan included a front spoiler, side skirts, rear spoiler, sport muffler and rear diffuser, diamond-like carbon fibre shock absorbers, 19-inch aluminium wheels (measuring 19x8.5J front and 19x9J rear, 45 mm front and 50 mm rear insets, 245/35ZR19 front and 265/30ZR19 rear tyres), member brace and performance dampers.

Variants

Powertrains

Transmissions

Motorsport 
A race car based on the Lexus LF-CC entered the 2014 Super GT GT500 class, replacing the SC 430. Vehicle shakedown began at the Suzuka Circuit. The car was renamed after the RC F prior to the start of the season.

Production 
Production at Tahara plant in Japan began on 25 April 2013.

As of June 2013, sales of the Lexus IS has reached 1,919 units.

Between 16 May 2013 and 16 June 2013, the order of IS sedans reached approximately 7,600 units, including 2,100 IS 250 and IS 350, 5,500 IS 300h models.

Motorsport 

The first-generation IS 200/300 and RS200 series was used by many racing teams, including Toyota Racing Development, Endless, TOM'S, APEXi, and Amuse to race in various touring car racing series across Asia, including an Altezza one-make racing series in Japan. In Europe, the Lexus IS 200 was raced in the British Touring Car Championship (through organizations such as BTC Racing), and the IS 300 was raced in the US via the Motorola Cup North American Street Stock Championship touring car series (with the manufacturer-sanctioned Team Lexus).

In 2001, Team Lexus entered three IS 300s in the third race of the 2001 Grand-Am Cup season at Phoenix, Arizona, and won their first IS 300 victory that year at the Virginia International Raceway. In 2002, Team Lexus raced the IS 300 in the Grand-Am Cup ST1 (Street Tuner) class, winning both the Drivers' and Team Championships, as well as a sweep of the top three finishes at Circuit Mont-Tremblant in Quebec, Canada.

In 2008, the second-generation IS 350 was entered in the Super GT race series in the GT300 class (cars with approximately ). The No. 19 Racing Project Bandoh IS 350 driven by Manabu Orido and Tsubasa Abe achieved its first victory in its fifth race at the Motegi GT300 race. In 2009, The Project Bandoh WedsSport IS 350, driven by Manabu Orido and Tatsuya Kataoka, won both driver and team title in the GT300 class that season.

In April 2009, a Lexus IS F entered by Gazoo Racing finished second to the team's Lexus LF-A in the SP8 class in the ADAC-Westfalenfahrt VLN 4h endurance race. An IS F was also entered in the 2009 24 Hours Nürburgring race and finished third in the SP8 class. In August 2009, an IS F entered by Gazoo Racing and driven by Peter Lyon, Hideshi Matsuda, and Kazunori Yamauchi won the SP8 class at the DMV Grenzlandrennen VLN race. Kazunori Yamauchi is the developer of Gran Turismo series, of which the IS line is playable in several versions, and the IS F racer carried test equipment for future game modes. The 3 drivers, along with Owen Mildenhall, participated in the 2010 24 Hours Nürburgring and finished in 4th place in the SP8 class, behind the 1st place ranked Lexus LFA.

In 2012, Japanese drift racer Daigo Saito entered an IS 250 C in the Formula Drift Asia series. The car, which was a victim of the 2011 Japan earthquake and tsunami and due to be scrapped, was purchased by Saito and heavily customized for drift racing use. The most notable modification was the swapping of the stock engine to a 2JZ-GTE from a Mark IV Toyota Supra.

Sales and production 
Sales data for Lexus IS generations are as follows, with chart numbers sourced from manufacturer yearly data.

Awards 
 J.D. Power and Associates named the second-generation IS 250/IS 350 sedans the best vehicles in the entry luxury class in its 2006 Initial Quality Survey.
 J.D. Power and Associates named the first-generation IS 300 sedan and IS 300 SportCross the best vehicles in the entry luxury class in its 2005 Initial Quality Survey.
 Ward's Auto bestowed the IS 350 V6 engine with one of its 10 Best Engines awards in 2006. The IS 350 V6 engine was also named to Ward's 10 Best Engines list in 2007, 2008, and 2009.
 The 2007 Lexus IS was the winner of the Intellichoice/AutoPacific Motorist Choice Award for Aspirational Luxury Cars, referring to the vehicle owners most desired in the luxury segment.
 The Lexus IS was named the winner of the 2007 IF product design award from the International Forum Design group in Hannover, Germany.
 The 2007 Lexus IS was the winner of the Golden Steering Wheel Award in the Luxury category, according to German newspaper, Bild am Sonntag. This award, selected by a jury panel of 25 automotive experts, was presented to Lexus in a Berlin ceremony.
 British automotive magazine Top Gear named the second-generation Lexus IS as the Executive Car of the Year in 2006.
 The Canadian Car of the Year Awards, selected by the Automobile Journalists Association of Canada, gave the IS 350 its Best New Technology award in 2006.
 The Lexus IS was a finalist for Wheels magazine's Car of the Year (COTY) awards and also the World Car of the Year (WCOTY) award in 2006.
 Kelley Blue Book gave the first-generation IS 300 its Best to Hold Value Award in 2001.
 The IS 250 was the winner in 2006 and 2007 of Best Prestige Car in the Australia's Best Cars awards – awarded by the conglomeration of all of Australia's respective State Automotive Associations.
 The Lexus IS came second in the Top Gear Satisfaction Survey 2005, beaten only by the Honda S2000.
 The Lexus IS came first in the 'J.D.Power' car satisfaction survey in 2011 and joint second in 2010.

References

External links 

 
 Lexus IS F international site

IS
Cars introduced in 1998
2000s cars
2010s cars
2020s cars
Compact executive cars
Sedans
Station wagons
Hardtop convertibles
Rear-wheel-drive vehicles
All-wheel-drive vehicles
Hybrid electric cars
Partial zero-emissions vehicles
Euro NCAP large family cars